The KB Golf Challenge was a golf tournament on the Challenge Tour, played in the Czech Republic. It was held 1995 to 1998, at Praha Karlstein in Prague.

Winners

References

External links
Coverage on the Challenge Tour's official site

Former Challenge Tour events
Golf tournaments in the Czech Republic
Recurring sporting events established in 1995
Recurring sporting events disestablished in 1998